Daniel Hunter (born 23 January 1990) is a British volleyball player and coach. Born in Poole, Dorset, England, he competed for Great Britain in the men's tournament at the 2012 Summer Olympics.

Career
Hunter began playing volleyball as an after school activity. He played club volleyball with Wessex, He made his international debut in 2009. Prior to his selection in Great Britain's 2012 Olympic Squad, Hunter played professional volleyball in Holland with Landstede Zwolle.

Coaching
Following his playing career Hunter returned to former club Wessex, coaching their women's Super League team.

References

1990 births
Living people
English men's volleyball players
Volleyball players at the 2012 Summer Olympics
Olympic volleyball players of Great Britain
Sportspeople from Poole